Jetpur may refer to the following entities in Gujarat, western India:

 Jetpur, Navagadh, a municipality
 Jetpur State, a former princely state with seat in the above town
 Jetpur Taluka, in Rajkot district
 Jetpur, Rajkot (Vidhan Sabha constituency), which includes the above taluka plus Jamkandorna Taluka and another village
 Jetpur, Chhota Udaipur (Gujarat Assembly constituency), another Gujarat Assembly constituency in Chhota Udaipur district.